Aarstad is a surname. Notable people with the surname include:

Hans Aarstad (1878–1954), Norwegian politician
Stian Aarstad, Norwegian musician
Wilhelm Aarstad (1854–1933), Norwegian politician

Norwegian-language surnames